A Morning Stroll is an English animated short film by Grant Orchard. The film was screened at the 2011 Brooklyn Film Festival as well as the 2012 Sundance Film Festival where it won Best Animation and the Jury Prize in Animated Short Film respectively. The film was also nominated Best Animated Short Film at the 84th Academy Awards as well as Best Short Animation at the 65th British Academy Film Awards.

The film is loosely based on an event in True Tales of American Life by American author Paul Auster.

References

External links 
 A Morning Stroll at StudioAKA's website
 

2011 films
British animated short films
Films set in New York (state)
Films set in 1959
Films set in 2009
Films set in 2059
2010s animated short films
2011 animated films
Films based on short fiction
2011 short films
2010s British films